Agustín Acosta was a Cuban baseball third baseman in the Cuban League. He played with Carmelita in 1904 and 1908 and with Matanzas in 1907 and 1908.

References

External links

Year of birth missing
Cuban League players
Cuban baseball players
Carmelita players
Matanzas players
Year of death unknown